COLT (Code Orchestra Livecoding Tool) is an ActionScript and JavaScript livecoding tool by Code Orchestra, available by subscription. As of 2019 it appears to be abandoned; the last activity in GitHub was 2015, and the domain name has been purchased by spammers.

History
The first version of COLT was released in May 2013, and at the time was the first available livecoding tool for the ActionScript Language. Further minor updates included mobile development support using Adobe AIR technology for iOS and Android devices. Version 1.1 included an upgraded Flex compiler boasting up to 3x compilation speed increase and allowed using the compiler bundled with an application as an external compiler for ActionScript IDEs using an external API. Version 1.2 featured JavaScript support and a completely reworked user interface.

Features

IDE integration

COLT is a separate tool that can be used with any IDE unlike most livecoding tools that limit a user to usage of a specific development environment. A code/resource routine is triggered on alteration of a file within COLT's project configured paths. It also provides an external API providing methods to export a project, run livecoding sessions and production build routines, etc. to ease the IDE integration.

Code Protection

To prevent an application from hanging or crashing due to the possible mistypes during live code updates, COLT manages to protect the running application from the following potentially dangerous cases:

 Illegal syntax
 Runtime errors
 Infinite loops/recursions

Languages

Version 1.2.2 includes support for ActionScript and JavaScript programming languages

ActionScript

 Runtime modifying and adding of fields, methods and classes
 Runtime updates of asset resources
 Adobe AIR support for iOS and Android livecoding
 Higher-performance Flex compiler

JavaScript

 Runtime modifying and adding of functions and variables
 Runtime updates of asset resources
 Live Reload capabilities (refreshing a browser page on project files alterations)
 Production build routines (scripts combining, minifying, compression, deployment, etc.)
 node.js support
 jQuery plugin for handling code/resources update events in client code

References

External links 
 archived
 

ActionScript
Adobe Flash
JavaScript
Live coding